Mike Morris (born July 14, 1983) is an American former professional ice hockey forward.  He was drafted in the first round, twenty-seventh overall, of the 2002 NHL Entry Draft by the San Jose Sharks, one of two NHL first round draft choices in history to attend Northeastern University (the other being Jamie Oleksiak).

Career
Morris was a star player at national prep hockey powerhouse St. Sebastian's, Needham, Massachusetts where he played and won the ISL Championship and the New England Prep school championship. Overlooked because of his size by many of the top college programs, Mike stayed local to play in Hockey East on a full scholarship to Northeastern University in Boston where he played forward.

Finishing second in team scoring in the 2004-05 season to Hobey Baker finalist Jason Guerriero, Morris suffered a major concussion at year's end and sat out the 2005-06 season (which would have been his senior year).  He eventually received a medical red shirt exception to play in 2006-07.  Morris returned as co-captain for that season, in which he played in only 20 games due to ongoing injuries, but nonetheless finished third on the team in points with 18.

Morris spent the 07–08 campaign playing for the Worcester Sharks (AHL) where he played in nine games, scoring two points.  He played in another 17 games for Worcester in 08-09 season, scoring eleven points, after which he was released from his contract, and retired from professional hockey.

Awards and honors

Career statistics

External links

1983 births
American men's ice hockey forwards
Ice hockey players from Massachusetts
Living people
National Hockey League first-round draft picks
Northeastern Huskies men's ice hockey players
Sportspeople from Braintree, Massachusetts
San Jose Sharks draft picks
Worcester Sharks players